Kamfiruz-e Jonubi Rural District is a rural district (dehestan) in Kamfiruz District, Marvdasht County, Fars Province, Iran. At the 2006 census, its population was 7,377, in 1,568 families.  The rural district has 8 villages.

References 

Rural Districts of Fars Province
Marvdasht County